Zeckendorf may refer to:

 Edouard Zeckendorf, Belgian mathematician known for Zeckendorf's theorem
 William Zeckendorf, Sr (1905-1976), American real estate developer
 William Zeckendorf, Jr. (1929-2014), real estate developer
 Zeckendorf Towers, a condominium in New York City
 Zeckendorf, Bavaria. a town near Bamberg, Bavaria.
 Louis Zeckendorf, American pioneer
 Zeckendorf v. Steinfeld, a case decided by the Supreme Court of the United States